Martina "Tina" Mundy Marie (born 26 December 1964 in Gander, Newfoundland and Labrador) is a Canadian politician who served in the Legislative Assembly of Prince Edward Island from 2015 to 2019.

Career
Prior to her election to the legislature, Mundy worked as a development officer for Holland College's campus in Summerside, and served for four years as a city councillor for Summerside City Council.

She was first elected in the 2015 provincial election. On 7 January 2016, Mundy was appointed to the Executive Council of Prince Edward Island as Minister of Family and Human Services.

She represented the electoral district of Summerside-St. Eleanors as a member of the Liberal Party until she was defeated in the 2019 Prince Edward Island general election.

References

1964 births
Living people
Women government ministers of Canada
Members of the Executive Council of Prince Edward Island
People from Gander, Newfoundland and Labrador
People from Summerside, Prince Edward Island
Prince Edward Island Liberal Party MLAs
Prince Edward Island municipal councillors
Women MLAs in Prince Edward Island
Women municipal councillors in Canada
21st-century Canadian politicians
21st-century Canadian women politicians